The Fartown Ground or just simply Fartown is a sports ground located in the Huddersfield suburb of Fartown in West Yorkshire, England and is predominantly famous for being the home ground of Huddersfield Rugby League Club from 1878 to 1992. The grounds consisted of a rugby ground, a cricket ground used by Yorkshire County Cricket Club, Bowling greens and a running track as well as a pavilion. It was the scene of many great games, including the Challenge Cup finals of 1908 and 1910, several Challenge Cup semi finals, John Player Cup finals and international matches.

Although the stands were all demolished, the pitch, floodlights and bankings where the terraces once stood are still there, Huddersfield RLFC played their last game there on 23 August 1992, up until the mid 2000s the club's junior and reserves sides still played on the pitch at Fartown but the stands were already demolished by then. The ground had fallen into serious decline in the 1980s, The Main stand was closed in 1986 due to safety issues after the Bradford City stadium fire in 1985 and partly reopened in 1989, a large chunk of the terrace side was condemned and never reopened, the supporters club building was demolished in 2009 after a fire.

It also hosted an FA Cup semi final game between Blackburn Rovers and Sheffield Wednesday in 1882.

Huddersfield are still known as "Fartown" or "the Fartowners" by many of their older supporters. The highest attendance at the stadium to watch a Huddersfield game was 32,912 against Wigan on 4 March 1950, although a Challenge Cup semi-final played 19 April 1947 attracted a crowd of 35,136.

History
The ground was originally known as the St John's Ground, after Huddersfield St John's Cricket Club who became its original occupants in 1868, the ground had previously been owned by the proprietor of the George Hotel in Huddersfield.

In 1875 St John's Cricket Club merged with Huddersfield Athletic Club to form the Huddersfield Cricket and Athletic Club. The name of the stadium was also changed to Fartown Grounds.

Although the athletic club had formed a rugby football section in 1866, Fartown was initially used for athletics festivals alterations made in the summer of 1878 meant that rugby could begin at the start of the 1878–79 season with the visit of Manchester Rangers on 2 November. The venue quickly became synonymous with Huddersfield RLFC.

Senior football was played at Fartown just once, an FA Cup semi final in 1882, organised as part of an attempt by the Football Association to promote the game of association football in what was, at the time, a predominantly rugby focused town. Blackburn Rovers drew 0–0 with Sheffield Wednesday, forcing a replay at Fallowfield in Manchester. Blackburn eventually won 5–1, and went on to lose 1–0 in the final to Old Etonians.

On 10 April 1882 (Easter Monday), the North of England v South of England men's Lacrosse match was played at the Fartown ground, with the North winning 2–0, "in the presence of a large number of spectators".  (see match report: 'Athletic News' 12 April 1882).

The Challenge Cup finals of 1908 and 1910 were played at Fartown with a replay at the ground required in 1910.

On 11 August 1943 an exhibition baseball game was staged between two teams of American soldiers which attracted 2,400 curious spectators.

In March 1973 the ground hosted its first John Player Trophy final, 10,102 spectators saw Leeds beat Salford 12–7. Leeds would feature in 2 semi finals a decade later, in December 1982, Leeds beat Widnes 8–2 in front of 7,247 fans and a year later the Loiners would beat Leigh 18–11 in front of 5,740 fans in what was the ground's last major fixture.

The ground hosted its last Challenge Cup semi final in April 1976 when St Helens narrowly beat Keighley 5–4 in front of a crowd of 9,829.

The 1980s saw the stadium decline rapidly as Huddersfield RLFC struggled to pull in spectators. The main stand was closed due to storm damage in 1986. A new board of directors took over in 1989 when and injected some much needed financial resources into the club. As well as beginning to improve the playing staff, the new owners also carried out a considerable amount of work on the Fartown stadium and by the end of the 1989–90 season significant progress was being made.

Huddersfield RLFC moved to Huddersfield Town F.C.'s Leeds Road stadium in 1992, and then to the McAlpine Stadium in 1994, although they continued to use Fartown as a training base until 2004. The ground is now rather dilapidated, and is only used for staging amateur rugby league games.

Cricket
The rugby ground was adjoined by a cricket field, once considered to be the finest wicket in Yorkshire. A total of 76 first-class and 9 list A one-day matches were played on the pitch, the first on 28 August 1873 when Yorkshire played Nottinghamshire, and the last on 17 August 1955, when Yorkshire defeated Gloucestershire by 67 runs.

Yorkshire also played games against the touring Australians and South Africans at Fartown and an England XI played the Australians there in 1884. The first county one day game played there was held on 1 June 1969 in the Player's County League against Sussex while the last came on 9 May 1982 in the John Player League when Yorkshire played Worcestershire.

Yorkshire's highest score at Fartown was the 579 for 6 declared they accumulated against Glamorgan in 1925 while Middlesex scored 527 in 1887. Worcestershire were dismissed for 24 in 1903 while Yorkshire were humiliated for 31 by Essex in 1935. AJ Webbe scored an unbeaten 243 in Middlesex's run spree in 1887 while the prolific Percy Holmes scored 220 not out for the Tykes against Warwickshire in 1922. A.W. Mold took 9 for 41 for Lancashire in a Roses Match in 1890 while CT Spencer took 9 for 63 for Leicestershire in 1954.

Rugby League Test Matches
The list of international rugby league matches played at Fartown is.

Rugby League Tour Matches
Fartown also saw Huddersfield, the county team Yorkshire and a Northern Rugby Football Union select side play host to international touring teams from Australia (sometimes playing as Australasia) and New Zealand from 1907 to 1973.

Huddersfield also faced Australia in the first game of their 1992 Rugby League World Cup Final tour, losing 66–2 at the Leeds Road ground on 9 October 1992.

Gallery

References

External links
Fartown on cricketarchive.com
Huddersfield Hawks American Football, current tenants

Huddersfield Giants
Defunct cricket grounds in England
Defunct football venues in England
Defunct rugby league venues in England
Cricket grounds in West Yorkshire
Sports venues completed in 1878
Sports venues in Huddersfield